Daniel Ruiz (born 1951) is a Spanish retired footballer who played as a striker.

Daniel Ruiz may also refer to:

 Daniel Ruiz La Rosa (born 1933), Peruvian footballer 
 Daniel Gustavo Ruiz (born 1984), Argentinian footballer
 Daniel Ruiz Robinson (born 1988), Mexican footballer
 Daniel Ruiz (footballer, born 2001), Colombian footballer
 Daniel Ruiz (motorcyclist) (born 1992), Spanish Grand Prix motorcycle racer
 Daniel Ruiz (field hockey) (born 1969), Argentine field hockey player
 Daniel Ruiz Posadas (born 1995), Spanish volleyball player

See also
 Daniel Guillén Ruiz (born 1984), Spanish footballer
 Daniel Ávila Ruiz (born 1971), Mexican politician